Eurosport 2 Xtra may refer to:

Eurosport 2 Xtra (Germany)
Eurosport 2 Xtra (Portugal)